Fried aired on BBC 2W in March/April 2002. Produced by Aspect Television and presented by Simon Adams, it was a mix of short films profiling real people throughout Wales with spoof profiles of fake people and events.

Presented by
Simon Adams

Writers, performers & filmmakers
Many people contributed to the writing, performing and production of the short films and links that made up the show. Several BBC Wales presenters made "tongue-in-cheek" cameo appearances in the series, including Jamie Owen, Oliver Hides, Frances Donovan, and Jason Mohammad.

Contributors
This list is incomplete*
Sara Allen
Colin Bowen
Stephen Bush
Sean Carlsen
Jon Chapple
Sally Collins
Karl Eldridge
Steve Jenkins
David Llewellyn
Pete Telfer
Tom Law

BBC television comedy
2000s British comedy television series
2002 British television series debuts
2002 British television series endings
2000s Welsh television series